Mount Olive is a city in Macoupin County, Illinois, United States. The population was 2,015 at the 2020 census. The city is part of the Metro East region within the St. Louis metropolitan area.

Geography

Mount Olive is located in southeastern Macoupin County. Illinois Route 138 has its eastern terminus in the city, leading west  to Benld. Former U.S. Route 66 passed through the north and west sides of the city and later on a wider alignment farther north and west of the city.

The city drains west to tributaries of Cahokia Creek, a west-flowing direct tributary of the Mississippi River, and southeast to Silver Creek, a south-flowing tributary of the Kaskaskia River.

Demographics

As of the census of 2000, there were 2,150 people, 906 households, and 609 families residing in the city. The racial makeup of the city was 96.79% White, 0.83% Native American, 0.64% Asian, 1.28% from other races, and 0.47% from two or more races. Hispanic or Latino of any race were 3% of the population.

There were 906 households, out of which 30.7% had children under the age of 18 living with them, 54.6% were married couples living together, 8.9% had a female householder with no husband present, and 32.7% were non-families. 29.6% of all households were made up of individuals, and 19.3% had someone living alone who was 65 years of age or older. The average household size was 2.37 and the average family size was 2.92.

In the city, the population was spread out, with 23.5% under the age of 18, 7.7% from 18 to 24, 28.8% from 25 to 44, 19.9% from 45 to 64, and 20.1% who were 65 years of age or older. The median age was 39 years. For every 100 females, there were 95.6 males. For every 100 females age 18 and over, there were 88.6 males.

The median income for a household in the city was $35,065, and the median income for a family was $41,765. Males had a median income of $30,709 versus $21,125 for females. The per capita income for the city was $17,172. About 6.1% of families and 6.1% of the population were below the poverty line, including 7.0% of those under age 18 and 6.7% of those age 65 or over.

Notable people 

 Frank Biscan, pitcher for the St Louis Browns
 Jess Dobernic, pitcher for the Chicago Cubs, Chicago White Sox and Cincinnati Reds
 Elmer Droste, Illinois state senator and lawyer
 Adolph Germer (1881-1966), National Executive Secretary of the  Socialist Party of America from 1916 to 1919 and national union organizer
 Mary Harris Jones, aka "Mother Jones", famed labor organizer; buried in Mount Olive
 Mike Kreevich, player for the Chicago Cubs, Chicago White Sox, Philadelphia Athletics, St. Louis Browns and Washington Senators

Points of interest 
In Mount Olive is located the Union Miners Cemetery where miners killed in the Battle of Virden and community and labor organizer Mary Harris "Mother" Jones are buried.

The cemetery sits just south of former U.S. Route 66. Soulsby Service Station is the oldest operating station on the historic route in Illinois. It is most easily reached by taking Exit 44 on Interstate 55 and going east off the exit ramp, then following the signs to the cemetery.

References 

Cities in Macoupin County, Illinois
Cities in Illinois